Papillons (French for "butterflies"), Op. 2, is a suite of piano pieces written in 1831 by Robert Schumann when he was 21 years old. The work is meant to represent a masked ball and was inspired by Jean Paul's novel  (The Awkward Age).

The suite begins with a six-measure introduction before launching into a variety of dance-like movements. Each movement is unrelated to the preceding ones, except that the second, A major, theme of the sixth movement recurs in G major in the tenth movement, and the theme of the first movement returns in the finale.  notes that the 11th movement is appropriately a polonaise because the novel's character Wina is Polish. The last movement starts out by quoting the theme of the traditional "Großvatertanz" (Grandfather's Dance), which was always played at the end of a wedding or similar celebration. Repeated notes near the end of the piece suggest a clock striking, signifying the end of the ball.

Structure
The composition's twelve movements are:

 Introduction. Moderato (D major)
 Waltz (D major)
 Waltz – Prestissimo (E major)
 Waltz (F minor)
 Waltz (A major)
 Polonaise (B major)
 Waltz (D minor)
 Waltz – Semplice (F minor)
 Waltz (C minor)
 Waltz – Prestissimo (B minor)
 Waltz – Vivo (C major)
 Polonaise (D major)
 Finale (D major)

Related works
Schumann quoted some themes from Papillons in his later work, Carnaval, Op. 9, but none of them appear in section no. 9 of that work titled "Papillons". The main waltz theme from the first movement in Papillons was quoted in the section "Florestan", with an explicit acknowledgement written in the score, and again in the final section, "Marche des Davidsbündler contre les Philistins", but without acknowledgement. The "Großvatertanz" also appears in the final section, with the inscription "Thème du XVIIème siècle".

Jörg Widmann quotes the first eight bars of the finale at the beginning of his third string quartet 'The Hunt':

"Großvatertanz" (Grandfather's Dance)

References

External links

, performed by Alexander Ullman

Piano music by Robert Schumann
Compositions for solo piano
1831 compositions
Music based on novels